The Avro 523 Pike (the first Avro aircraft to receive a name) was a British multi-role combat aircraft of the First World War that did not progress past the prototype stage. It was intended to provide the Royal Naval Air Service with an anti-Zeppelin fighter that was also capable of long-range reconnaissance and bombing.

Design and development
The Avro Pike was a large, three-bay biplane of conventional layout driven by two pusher propellers. Three open cockpits were provided, the centre one for the pilot, with gunners fore and aft of him. The Admiralty evaluated the type, but rejected it. Avro then built a second prototype, substituting the original's Sunbeam engines for Green E.6 engines instead and designated it the 523A.

Operational history
The Admiralty evaluated this in November 1916, but found that the type was by then obsolete and did not place an order. The two prototypes flew as testbeds with Avro for the remainder of the war.

Specifications (523)

References

Notes

Citations

Bibliography

 Jackson, A.J. Avro Aircraft since 1908. London: Putnam, 1990. . 
 Mason, Francis K. The British Bomber since 1912. London: Putnam, 1994. . 
 Taylor, Michael J. H. Jane's Encyclopedia of Aviation. London: Studio Editions, 1989, p. 93. 
 World Aircraft Information Files. London: Bright Star Publishing.

Cancelled military aircraft projects of the United Kingdom
Pike
1910s British bomber aircraft
1910s British fighter aircraft
1910s British military reconnaissance aircraft
Twin-engined pusher aircraft
Biplanes
Aircraft first flown in 1916